Promenade Park is the premier urban park in Maldon, Essex, England.

History
The park is Victorian and was opened in 1895 to provide the people of Maldon with a green space. The original park lodge has been converted into Maldon Museum. Maldon Marine Lake was created in 1905, and greatly added to the attraction of the area as a location for outdoor swimming. In 2002, there was a fatality at the lake, and unable to afford lifeguards, the district council banned swimming. In 2017, there was a petition for the return of swimming at the lake.

Facilities

There is an ornamental lake with fountains, an amphitheatre, a splash park, a children’s play area, a lake for model boating, and riverside walks. This area also includes dedicated picnic areas with picnic tables, formal gardens with a pergola, sports pitches and changing rooms, skateboarding and BMX areas and three separate toilet blocks including disabled facilities.

Events
Maldon parkrun takes place every Saturday morning in the park.
Maldon Mud Race takes place each year and involves racing through 550m of mud.

References

Parks and open spaces in Essex